Fredrik Larsson may refer to:

Fredrik Larsson (racing driver), Swedish racing driver
Fredrik Larsson (golfer), Swedish golfer
Fredrik Larsson, bassist for Swedish heavy metal band HammerFall